Kim Heonchang (died 822) was the leader of an aristocratic rebellion in early ninth-century Unified Silla. He was a seventh-generation descendant of King Muyeol, and thus bore the "true bone" status in the Silla bone rank system.  His activities are probably linked to strife between different lineages of the Silla royal house.

Gim's father, Gim Ju-won, was first in line to take the Silla throne after the death of King Seondeok.  However, Gim Gyeong-sin seized power by military force and became King Wonseong.  Gim Ju-won fled to the province of Myeongju, around modern-day Gangneung. These events probably laid the foundation for his son's (and grandson's) rebellious activities. 

After King Aejang was slain by Kim Eon-seung, who then became king, Gim Heon-chang launched a rebellion which rapidly gained control over the modern-day areas of Gwangju, Cheongju, and Gongju. He named his country Jang-an (장안, 長安) and took the era name Gyeong-un (경운, 慶雲). The rebellion went on to seize Jeonju, Sangju, Chungju, and Gimhae, thus gaining control over much of the southern and western Korean peninsula. It appears that he was aided by many other members of the Muyeol lineage.

After a month's fighting, the royal faction was able to regain much of the territory that Gim Heon-chang's forces had taken. After the fall of Gongju, which had been the center of the rebellion, Gim Heon-chang killed himself.

Three years later, his son Kim Beop-mun rekindled the rebellion, but was shortly thereafter also crushed by the royal army.

See also
Unified Silla
History of Korea

822 deaths
Silla people
Rebellions in Asia
9th-century conflicts
Year of birth unknown
Suicides in Korea